Telar Ring Deng (28 December 1957-27 December 2020) was a South Sudanese politician and statesman. Telar died from Covid-19 related-complications on December 27, 2020 two days after announcing that he tested positive for Covid-19.  At the time of his death Ambassador Telar was nominated to the Revitalized Transitional National Assembly by SPLM-IO, and was primed as the Minority Leader. This was after his appointment as minister was rejected. It is understood that President Kiir retracted his earlier position of allocating Lakes state to SPLM-IO after it became apparent to him that Dr. Riek had nominated Ambassador Telar for governorship. Telar was an Atout Dinka, hailing from Yirol. When the SPLA split, Telar sided with SPLA-Nasir. Together with Deng Ayuen Kurr, Telar was the most prominent Dinka leader in SPLA-Nasir. Telar and Deng accompanied Lam Akol during his two-month stay in Western Europe. However Telar and Deng left SPLA-Nasir after the Frankfurt talks, disappointed that separation had not been mentioned in the documents of the peace talks and the rapprochement between SPLA-Nasir and the Khartoum government. Telar and Deng returned to the mainstream faction of the SPLA/SPLM.

Telar also represented the New Sudan Council of Churches for a period. He was also a negotiator for Riek Machar during reconciliation with the SPLM.
He was reappointed by President Kiir as Legal Advisor, a post that he served before being named designate Justice Minister.

During the CPA period, Telar was named Minister of the Presidency of Southern Sudan. However, he was expelled from the SPLM by a presidential decree of President Salva Kiir on November 23, 2007. Telar was reinstated as a SPLM member on August 28, 2009.

In 2013 Telar was named Minister of Justice by President Salva Kiir. However, on August 13, 2013 the parliament of South Sudan voted by majority against Telar's nomination. 150 MPs voted against Telar's appointment, 97 in favour. This was the first time a presidential nomination for minister had been rejected by the South Sudanese parliament.

In October 2014 he was named as the new South Sudanese envoy to the Russian Federation, a post he held until resigning in January 2018. Telar Ring died on 27 December 2020, reportedly from COVID-19 in Juba at the Aspen Medical Center, where he was being treated for the disease.

References

Sudan People's Liberation Movement politicians
People from Lakes (state)
1957 births
2020 deaths
Deaths from the COVID-19 pandemic in South Sudan
Ambassadors of South Sudan to Russia